The Hum Award for Best Soap Series  is one of the Hum Awards of Merit presented annually by the Hum Television Network and Entertainment Channel (HTNEC) to production company of their producers working in the television industry  for producing daily Soaps. As of 3rd Hum Awards, there have been 12 dramas nominated for the Best Drama Serial award.

History
Hum Television Network and Entertainment Channel presented this award to producers of Pakistani TV industry, as of first ceremony four soap series were nominated and currently Momina Duraid was honored at 1st Hum Awards ceremony 2012 for her series in Mujhay Roothnay Na Daina. The name of the category officially termed by the channel is:

 2013 → present: Hum Award for Best Soap Series

Winners and nominees
In the list below, winners are listed first in the colored row, as of first ceremony four soap series was nominated. Following the hum's practice, the Soap series below are listed by year of their Pakistan qualifying run, which is usually (but not always) the soap series year of release.

For the first ceremony, the eligibility period spanned full calendar years. For example, the 1st Hum Awards presented on April 28, 2013, to declared the best sitcoms of the years that were released between January, 2012, and December, 2012, the period of eligibility is the full previous calendar year from January 1 to December 31.

Date and the award ceremony shows that the 2010 is the period from 2010-2020 (10 years-decade), while the year above winners and nominees shows that the series year in which they were telecast, and the figure in bracket shows the ceremony number, for example; an award ceremony is held for the dramas of its previous year.

2010s

See also 
 Hum Awards
 Hum Awards pre-show
 List of Hum Awards Ceremonies

References

External links
Official websites
 Hum Awards official website
 Hum Television Network and Entertainment Channel (HTNEC)
 Hum's Channel at YouTube (run by the Hum Television Network and Entertainment Channel)
 Hum Awards at Facebook (run by the Hum Television Network and Entertainment Channel)]

Hum Awards
Hum Award winners
Hum TV
Hum Network Limited